Wendling Abbey was monastic house in Norfolk, England.

References

Monasteries in Norfolk